Heinz Beck (Friedrichshafen, 3 November 1963) is  a German-born, three-Michelin starred chef, and a founder of The Order of the Knights of Italian Cuisine.

Chef history 
Beck spent his early culinary history cooking in restaurants such as Tantris in Munich, Tristán in Mallorca and Residenz Heinz Winkler in Aschau, Germany. Beck came to the Rome restaurant La Pergola in 1994, and became executive chef at the restaurant. Between 2009 and 2013, Beck ran the restaurant Apsley's, A Heinz Beck restaurant in London, which had received a Michelin star. In April 2018, Beck opened a new restaurant inside the Brown Hotel in London, following a pop-up restaurant in the same location that the chef launched with sommelier Salvator Calabrese in November 2017.

Restaurants 
 La Pergola – Rome – Michelin since November 2005
 Café Les Pailotes – Pescara (Italy) – Michelin since 2009
 Heinz Beck Seasons at Castello di Fighine – San Casciano dei Bagni (Siena) – Michelin since 2013
 Gusto by Heinz Beck at Conrad Algarve – Portugal
 Social by Heinz Beck at Waldorf Astoria Dubai Palm Jumeirah – Dubai
 Heinz Beck and Sensi by Heinz Beck – Tokyo
 Taste of Italy by Heinz Beck – Dubai

Awards 
 Three-Michelin Stars – La Pergola
 One-Michelin Star – Apsleys – A Heinz Beck Restaurant, at The Lanesborough
 Golden Medal of the Artists Foyer from La Sapienza Rome University
 One Michelin Star – Apsley

Published works

References 

German chefs
Living people
Head chefs of Michelin starred restaurants
Year of birth missing (living people)